Duvar is a settlement in Prince Edward Island, in Canada.

Communities in Prince County, Prince Edward Island